The 1998 Tennessee Oilers season was the franchise's 39th season overall, 29th with the National Football League (NFL), and their final season as the Oilers; they would be renamed the Titans the following year.

The team matched their previous season's output of 8–8, marking their third straight season with exactly eight wins. The Oilers failed to qualify for the playoffs for the fifth consecutive year.

The 1998 season was the only year the Oilers would play in Vanderbilt Stadium, an undersized stadium that was used as a temporary stopgap until the team's new permanent stadium could be constructed. The Oilers, who had originally intended to stay in Houston until the stadium was finished, were 'forced out' of Houston due to poor attendance in 1996, and were again forced out of their "Plan B," Liberty Bowl Memorial Stadium in Memphis, after attendance was even worse there in 1997.

Offseason

NFL draft

Personnel

Staff

Roster

Schedule

Preseason

Regular season

Game Summaries

Week 1: at Cincinnati Bengals

Steve McNair completed ten passes and a touchdown to Willie Davis but did not play in the second half with an elbow issue; Dave Krieg led three drives ending in points and a 23-14 Oilers win.

Week 2: vs. San Diego Chargers

Former Oilers offensive coordinator Kevin Gilbride had been hired as Chargers head coach after Bobby Ross left for the Lions and with rookie Ryan Leaf he led the Chargers to Vanderbilt Stadium (three and a half miles from where Tennessee’s new stadium was being built), a trip ending in a 13-7 Chargers win.  Tennessee’s only score was McNair’s fifteen yard strike to Frank Wycheck at the end of the second quarter.

Week 3: at New England Patriots

The Oilers faced the Patriots for the first time since their ill-fated 1993 season and the ensuing game became a highly competitive affair.  The lead tied or changed seven times as McNair led three field goal drives and completed a twenty-two yard score to Eddie George, but following Drew Bledsoe’s 51-yard score to Terry Glenn (a Bledsoe interception in the second quarter was erased on back to back encroachment penalties) McNair was intercepted by Lawyer Milloy for another Patriots touchdown and 27-16 final.

Week 4: vs. Jacksonville Jaguars

The unbeaten Jaguars stayed that way 27-22 in a game where the lead changed five times, three times in the second half.  McNair was intercepted twice and following the two minute warning Dave Krieg was put in but completed just one pass.

Week 6: at Baltimore Ravens

In the third ever game at the future M&T Bank Stadium the Ravens opened by sacking Steve McNair for a safety, but after three straight punts McNair answered by running in a 40-yard touchdown.  Two subsequent field goals were enough to offset two Ravens field goals and a 12-6 Oilers win.

Week 7: vs. Cincinnati Bengals

The Oilers got their first home victory by erupting to 515 yards of offense (304 of them in the first half outclassing the Bengals by 232 yards) and 44 points in a 44-14 slaughter of Cincinnati.  Running back Mike Archie opened scoring when he made the Bengals look like meatheads on an 18-yard touchdown to Jackie Harris. Steve McNair completed sixteen passes for 277 yards and a 45-yard score to Kevin Dyson while scoring also on a one-yard sneak.

Week 8: vs. Chicago Bears

Jeff Fisher faced his former team and his Oilers had a struggle. Fumbles on a double handoff in the first quarter and on the second half opening kick return led to a Bears lead but the Oilers erased a 20-10 gap to tie the game.  A Jeff Jaeger field goal with 1:07 to go put the Bears up 23-20 but the Oilers drove to the Bears 31, but the Craig Hentrich field goal kick was blocked for the Bears win.

Week 9: at Pittsburgh Steelers

The Oilers intercepted Kordell Stewart three times while Steve McNair threw three touchdowns as they raced to a 34-7 lead and won 41-31; Mike Tomczak replaced Stewart and threw two late touchdowns.

Week 10: at Tampa Bay Buccaneers

Future Indianapolis Colts head coach Tony Dungy faced the future Tennessee Titans with official announcement of the Titans name adoption pending within the week.  The Bucs led 16-3 at the half but the Oilers outscored them 28-6 from there, highlighted by Steve McNair’s 71-yard run at the two minute warning.

Week 11: vs. Pittsburgh Steelers

The Oilers change to Titans had become public entering this game and against the future Titans the Steelers led 14-13 at the half on two Kordell Stewart touchdowns (overcoming a failed fourth down conversion on the opening drive).  The game was stalemated from there; twice fourth down attempts by the Titans failed, but after a fourth down failure by Stewart in the final five minutes (the attempt called because coach Bill Cowher mistrusted kicker Matt George after a blocked field goal attempt on Pittsburgh’s second possession) McNair completed three passes for a net of 54 yards before the Al Del Greco field goal with three seconds to go.  But scoring wasn’t completed as Steelers laterals on the kickoff were driven into their own end zone and a final Tennessee touchdown.

Week 12: vs New York Jets

With the Titans name adoption now official the Oilers hosted the former New York Titans (a former division rival) and the game was tied 3-3 at the half.  From there the Jets scored 21 unanswered points and reached 7-4 with the Oilers falling to 6-5

Week 13: at Seattle Seahawks

Former Oiler Warren Moon suited up but did not play for the Seahawks as Seattle clawed to a 17-9 lead, but McNair drove to a touchdown run; Eddie George’s two point run was ruled not to have crossed the goal line plane, so the score was 17-15.  After sacking Jon Kitna on the Seahawks drive the Oilers got the ball back and Al Del Greco’s field goal put Tennessee up 18-17.  Kitna completed a deep pass to James McKnight and a roughing penalty added fifteen more yards; it ended on Todd Peterson’s 48-yard field goal and 20-18 Seahawks win.

Week 14: vs. Baltimore Ravens

Hosting the Ravens the Titans ground out a 16-14 win in which the budding bitterness of the rivalry spilled into several incidents including a Brad Hopkins roughness penalty late in the second quarter and a hit out of bounds by the Titans on Ravens quarterback Jim Harbaugh.  Harbaugh got the ball back with 1:18 to go but his pass into traffic was intercepted.

Week 15: at Jacksonville Jaguars

With the Jaguars surging to their first AFC Central title they started Jamie Martin instead of Mark Brunell and clawed to a 10-0 lead but the Oilers scored thirteen straight points; Jonathan Quinn replaced Martin in the second half; he was intercepted at the Titans goal line but led a drive ending in a tying field goal with seven minutes to go.  After an exchange of punts McNair in the final two and a half minutes completed three passes for 33 yards and ran three times for eighteen more and the winning Del Greco field goal.

Week 16: at Green Bay Packers

The Packers led wire to wire on three Brett Favre touchdowns winning 30-22 despite three touchdowns by Steve McNair.   The Oilers’ inability to win outside the AFC Central (now just 1-6 outside the division) was thus looming as denying a playoff spot.

Week 17: vs Minnesota Vikings

The Oilers officially ended as such in a 26-16 loss to the 15-1 Vikings.  The Oilers led 13-5 before Randall Cunningham erupted to two touchdown throws, securing Minnesota’s run to the NFC Central title and playoff bye, while leaving the Titans to rest and regroup for next season.

Standings

References

External links
 1998 Tennessee Oilers at Pro-Football-Reference.com

1998
Tennessee Oilers
Titans